Greater Talent Network (also known as GTN) was an American speakers bureau based in New York and is currently owned by United Talent Agency. GTN was known for its roster of prominent clients, including authors Nicholas Sparks, Ben Shapiro, Michael Lewis, and P.J. O'Rourke; actors Laura Linney, Mark Ruffalo and Danny Glover; musicians Paula Abdul and Harry Belafonte; Navy SEALs Marcus Luttrell and Kevin Lacz; athletes Alex Rodriguez  and Apolo Ohno; sports executives Billy Beane and Bob Myers; national security experts Raymond Kelly, Richard Clarke, and General Wesley Clark; finance/technology disruptor Dan Schulman, and Daniele Weisberg and Carly Zakin, founders of theSkimm.

History
In September 2017, GTN was acquired by global talent and entertainment company United Talent Agency.

Notable clients
 Nicholas Sparks
 Ben Shapiro
 Anthony Zuiker
 Paula Abdul
 Billy Beane
 Carl Bernstein
 Wesley Clark
 Ben Cohen and Jerry Greenfield, founders of Ben & Jerry's
 Sebastian Junger
 Raymond Kelly
 Michael Lewis
 Laura Linney
 Marcus Luttrell
 Marlee Matlin
 Bob Myers
 Bennet Omalu
 Ron Paul
 Mo Rocca
 Alec Ross
 P.J. O'Rourke
 Mark Ruffalo
 Dan Schulman
 Nicholas Sparks
 Leigh Anne Tuohy
 Jose Antonio Vargas
 Jennifer Weiner

References

External links 
 Greater Talent Network Speakers Bureau

Speakers bureaus
American companies established in 1982